"St. Teresa" is a song by American singer-songwriter Joan Osborne. Released in May 1996 as the second single from her debut album, Relish (1995), it was written by Osborne as well as its producer Rick Chertoff and the Hooters members Eric Bazilian and Rob Hyman. It failed to chart in the US but had some minor international chart success.

Background and release 
Written about a sex worker she witnessed openly engaging in drug dealing in their shared Manhattan neighbourhood, Osborne has said that she penned the lyrics to "St. Teresa" while under hypnosis in a desperate attempt to overcome writer's block. Alongside the simple fact that she found the name St. Teresa "singable," the singer further explained the song's connection to its namesake Saint Teresa of Jesus in an interview with The Irish Times:

"St. Teresa" received airplay on triple-A and modern rock stations in late 1995 as a "warm-up" track to help the album gain exposure. It was also accompanied by a music video. Later given a proper commercial release in 1996 following the global success of "One of Us," it was once again promoted with another music video, directed by Osborne herself. In it, she plays a hotel maid discovering bizarre and supernatural occurrences while cleaning, including goldfish living in a toilet and bathtub as well as a levitating woman. 

The re-release led to the song reaching the top 50 of the Australian, British, New Zealand, and Swedish singles charts. It also earned a nomination for Best Female Rock Vocal Performance at the 38th Annual Grammy Awards but ultimately lost to Alanis Morissette's "You Oughta Know."

Track listings

Personnel 
Personnel are adapted from the CD liner notes of Relish.

 Joan Osborne – lead vocals
 Rick Chertoff – production
 William Wittman – mixing, recording
 Eric Bazilian – chant, guitar, mandolin
 Mark Egan – bass guitar
 Rob Hyman – organ, synthesizer
 Andy Kravitz – drums

Charts

Release history

References 

1995 songs
1996 singles
Joan Osborne songs
Mercury Records singles
Song recordings produced by Rick Chertoff
Songs written by Eric Bazilian